In enzymology, a 1-pyrroline-5-carboxylate dehydrogenase is an enzyme that catalyzes the chemical reaction

 (S)-1-pyrroline-5-carboxylate + NAD+ + 2 H2O  L-glutamate + NADH + H+

The three substrates of this enzyme are (S)-1-pyrroline-5-carboxylate, NAD+, and H2O, whereas its three products are glutamate, NADH, and H+.

This enzyme belongs to the family of oxidoreductases, specifically those acting on the CH-NH group of donors with NAD+ or NADP+ as acceptor.  The systematic name of this enzyme class is (S)-1-pyrroline-5-carboxylate:NAD+ oxidoreductase. Other names in common use include delta-1-pyrroline-5-carboxylate dehydrogenase, 1-pyrroline dehydrogenase, pyrroline-5-carboxylate dehydrogenase, pyrroline-5-carboxylic acid dehydrogenase, L-pyrroline-5-carboxylate-NAD+ oxidoreductase, and 1-pyrroline-5-carboxylate:NAD+ oxidoreductase. This enzyme participates in glutamate metabolism and arginine and proline metabolism.

Structural studies

Human gene

In human, the protein is encoded by ALDH4A1 gene.

References 

 
 

EC 1.2.1
Oxidoreductases